A satellite modem or satmodem is a modem used to establish data transfers using a communications satellite as a relay. A satellite modem's main function is to transform an input bitstream to a radio signal and vice versa. 

There are some devices that include only a demodulator (and no modulator, thus only allowing data to be downloaded by satellite) that are also referred to as "satellite modems."  These devices are used in satellite Internet access (in this case uploaded data is transferred through a conventional PSTN modem or an ADSL modem).

Satellite link 

A satellite modem is not the only device needed to establish a communication channel. Other equipment that is essential for creating a satellite link include satellite antennas and frequency converters.

Data to be transmitted are transferred to a modem from data terminal equipment (e.g. a computer). The modem usually has intermediate frequency (IF) output (that is, 50-200 MHz), however, sometimes the signal is modulated directly to L band. In most cases, frequency has to be converted using an upconverter before amplification and transmission.

A modulated signal is a sequence of symbols, pieces of data represented by a corresponding signal state, e.g. a bit or a few bits, depending upon the modulation scheme being used. Recovering a symbol clock (making a local symbol clock generator synchronous with the remote one) is one of the most important tasks of a demodulator.

Similarly, a signal received from a satellite is firstly downconverted (this is done by a Low-noise block converter - LNB), then demodulated by a modem, and at last handled by data terminal equipment. The LNB is usually powered by the modem through the signal cable with 13 or 18 V DC.

Features 
The main functions of a satellite modem are modulation and demodulation. Satellite communication standards also define error correction codes and framing formats.

Popular modulation types being used for satellite communications:
 Binary phase-shift keying (BPSK);
 Quadrature phase-shift keying (QPSK);
 Offset quadrature phase-shift keying (OQPSK);
 8PSK;
 Quadrature amplitude modulation (QAM), especially 16QAM.

The popular satellite error correction codes include:
 Convolutional codes:
 with constraint length less than 10, usually decoded using a Viterbi algorithm (see Viterbi decoder);
 with constraint length more than 10, usually decoded using a Fano algorithm (see Sequential decoder);
 Reed–Solomon codes usually concatenated with convolutional codes with an interleaving;
 New modems support superior error correction codes (turbo codes and LDPC codes).

Frame formats that are supported by various satellite modems include:
 Intelsat business service (IBS) framing
 Intermediate data rate (IDR) framing
 MPEG-2 transport framing (used in DVB)
 E1 and T1 framing

High-end modems also incorporate some additional features:

 Multiple data interfaces (like RS-232, RS-422, V.35, G.703, LVDS, Ethernet);
 Embedded Distant-end Monitor and Control (EDMAC), allowing to control the distant-end modem;
 Automatic Uplink Power Control (AUPC), that is, adjusting the output power to maintain a constant signal to noise ratio at the remote end;
 Drop and insert feature for a multiplexed stream, allowing to replace some channels in it.

Internal structure 

Probably the best way of understanding how a modem works is to look at its internal structure. A block diagram of a generic satellite modem is shown on the image.

Analog tract 
After a digital-to-analog conversion in the transmitter, the signal passes through a reconstruction filter. Then, if needed, frequency conversion is performed. 

The purpose of the analog tract in the receiver is to convert signal's frequency, to adjust its power via an automatic gain control circuit and to get its complex envelope components.

The input signal for the analog tract is at the intermediate frequency, sometimes, in the L band, in which case it must be converted to an IF. Then the signal is either sampled or processed by the four-quadrant multiplier which produces the complex envelope components (I, Q) through multiplying it by the heterodyne frequency (see superheterodyne receiver).

At last the signal passes through an anti-aliasing filter and is sampled or (digitized).

Modulator and demodulator 
A digital modulator transforms a digital stream into a radio signal at the intermediate frequency (IF). A modulator is generally simpler than a demodulator because it doesn't have to recover symbol and carrier frequencies.

A demodulator is one of the most important parts of the receiver. The exact structure of the demodulator is defined by a modulation type. However, the fundamental concepts are similar. Moreover, it is possible to develop a demodulator that can process signals with different modulation types.

Digital demodulation implies that a symbol clock (and, in most cases, an intermediate frequency generator) at the receiving side has to be synchronous with those at the transmitting side. This is achieved by the following two circuits:
 timing recovery circuit, determining the borders of symbols;
 carrier recovery circuit, which determines the actual meaning of each symbol. There are modulation types (like frequency-shift keying) that can be demodulated without carrier recovery, however, this method, known as noncoherent demodulation, is generally worse.

There are also additional components in the demodulator such as the intersymbol interference equalizer.

If the analog signal was digitized without a four-quadrant multiplier, the complex envelope has to be calculated by a digital complex mixer.

Sometimes a digital automatic gain control circuit is implemented in the demodulator.

FEC coding 
Error correction techniques are essential for satellite communications, because, due to satellite's limited power a signal-to-noise ratio at the receiver is usually rather poor. Error correction works by adding an artificial redundancy to a data stream at the transmitting side and using this redundancy to correct errors caused by noise and interference. This is performed by an FEC encoder. The encoder applies an error correction code to the digital stream, thereby adding redundancy.

An FEC decoder decodes the Forward error correction code used within the signal.

Differential coding 

There are several modulation types (such as PSK and QAM) that have a phase ambiguity, that is, a carrier can be restored in different ways. Differential coding is used to resolve this ambiguity.

When differential coding is used, the data are deliberately made to depend not only on the current symbol, but also on the previous one.

Scrambling 

Scrambling is a technique used to randomize a data stream to eliminate long '0'-only and '1'-only sequences and to assure energy dispersal. Long '0'-only and '1'-only sequences create difficulties for timing recovery circuit. Scramblers and descramblers are usually based on linear-feedback shift registers.

A scrambler randomizes the transmitted data stream. A descrambler restores the original stream from the scrambled one.

Scrambling shouldn't be confused with encryption, since it doesn't protect information from intruders.

Multiplexing  
A multiplexer transforms several digital streams into one stream. This is often referred to as 'muxing.'

Generally, a demultiplexer is a device that transforms one multiplexed data stream into several. Satellite modems don't have many outputs, so a demultiplexer here performs a drop operation, allowing to the modem to choose channels that will be transferred to the output.

A demultiplexer achieves this goal by maintaining frame synchronization.

Applications 

Satellite modems are often used for home internet access.

There are two different types, both employing the Digital Video Broadcasting (DVB) standard as their basis:
 One-way satmodems (DVB-IP modems) use a return channel not based on communication with the satellite, such as telephone or cable.
 Two-way satmodems (DVB-RCS modems, also called astromodems) employ a satellite-based return channel as well; they do not need another connection. DVB-RCS is ETSI standard EN 301 790.

There are also industrial satellite modems intended to provide a permanent link. They are used, for example, in the Steel shankar network.

See also 
 Communications satellite
 Yahsat
 Intelsat
 Satellite Internet access
 VSAT

External links 

Satellite broadcasting
Modems
Telecommunications equipment
Telecommunications infrastructure